Bromide Junction is an unincorporated community in Johnston County, Oklahoma, United States. It was a stop on the Kansas, Oklahoma and Gulf Railway line from Joplin, Missouri to Denison, Texas. A four-mile branch line, which was built by the Missouri, Oklahoma, and Gulf Railway Company, connected Bromide Junction to Bromide.

References

Unincorporated communities in Johnston County, Oklahoma
Unincorporated communities in Oklahoma